Jeu de paume was an event contested at the 1908 Summer Olympics. This was the only Summer Olympic Games to contain this sport as a medal event. An outdoor version called longue paume was a demonstration sport at the 1900 Summer Olympics. Real tennis, as jeu de paume is called in the United Kingdom, was an exhibition event at the 1924 Summer Olympics. In the Official Report of the 1908 Olympic Games, the sport is referred to as "Tennis (jeu de paume)" while tennis is named "lawn tennis."

The competition venue was the Queen's Club in West Kensington, London.

Participating nations
Each nation could enter up to 12 players. 11 players from 2 nations competed.

Medal table
Sources:

Results

Standings

Bracket

References

 
 
  (Excerpt available at )

 
1908 Summer Olympics events
Jeu de paume at the Summer Olympics
1908 in jeu de paume
Discontinued sports at the Summer Olympics